The Never Ending Tour is the popular name for Bob Dylan's endless touring schedule since June 7, 1988.

Background
Bob Dylan's eighth tour of Japan was announced via his official website on December 22, 2015. The tour was slated to take place throughout April covering several major Japanese cities including Tokyo and Osaka.

On March 22, 2016, it was announced that Dylan, among others, would headline the Ravinia Festival in Highland Park, Illinois, during the summer. A full U.S. summer tour was announced on Dylan's official website on March 7, 2016, beginning in Woodinville, Washington, on June 4 and ending in Guilford, New Hampshire, on July 17, in support of Dylan's upcoming album Fallen Angels.

On May 3, 2016, it was officially confirmed that Dylan, with his band, would perform at Desert Trip, a festival at the Empire Polo Club in Indio, California, featuring performers from the 1960s and 1970s. Dylan was to share the bill with The Rolling Stones, Paul McCartney, Neil Young, Roger Waters and The Who. Following the two Desert Trip performances, Dylan and his band will embark on a complete twenty-seven date tour, throughout the Eastern, Southern and Western United States; this was announced via Dylan's official website on August 8, 2016.

The 2016 tour comprises seventy-five concerts, the fewest concerts Dylan has performed in a year since the Never Ending Tour's début in 1988, when he also performed seventy-five concerts.

Support acts
Mavis Staples: North America (June 4 – July 17, 2016)

Set list
This set list is representative of the performance on November 23, 2016 at the Au-Rene Theater in Fort Lauderdale, Florida. It does not represent the set list at all concerts for the duration of the tour.

"Things Have Changed"
"Don't Think Twice, It's All Right"
"Highway 61 Revisited"
"Beyond Here Lies Nothin'"
"Full Moon and Empty Arms"
"High Water (For Charley Patton)"
"Melancholy Mood"
"Duquesne Whistle"
"Love Sick"
"Tangled Up in Blue"
"Pay in Blood"

"Why Try to Change Me Now"
"Scarlet Town"
"I Could Have Told You"
"Desolation Row"
"Soon After Midnight"
"All or Nothing at All"
"Long and Wasted Years"
"Autumn Leaves"
Encore
"Blowin' in the Wind"
"Stay With Me"

{{hidden
| headercss = background: #ccccff; font-size: 100%; width: 100%;
| contentcss = text-align: left; font-size: 100%; width: 100%;
| header = Desert Trip set lists
| content =

October 7
"Rainy Day Women ♯12 & 35"
"Don't Think Twice, It's All Right"
"Highway 61 Revisited"
"It's All Over Now, Baby Blue"
"High Water (For Charley Patton)"
"Simple Twist of Fate"
"Early Roman Kings"
"Love Sick"
"Tangled Up in Blue"
"Lonesome Day Blues"
"Make You Feel My Love"
"Pay in Blood"
"Desolation Row"
"Soon after Midnight"
"Ballad of a Thin Man"
Encore
"Masters of War"

October 14
"Rainy Day Women ♯12 & 35"
"Don't Think Twice, It's All Right"
"Highway 61 Revisited"
"It's All Over Now, Baby Blue"
"High Water (For Charley Patton)"
"Simple Twist of Fate"
"Early Roman Kings"
"Love Sick"
"Tangled Up in Blue"
"Lonesome Day Blues"
"Make You Feel My Love"
"Pay in Blood"
"Desolation Row"
"Soon after Midnight"
"Ballad of a Thin Man"
Encore
"Like a Rolling Stone"
"Why Try to Change Me Now"

}}

Tour dates

Cancellations and rescheduled shows

Notes

Personnel
Bob Dylan – Vocals, Piano, Harmonica, Guitar
Tony Garnier – Electric bass, Double bass
Donnie Herron – Lap steel, Pedal steel, Banjo, Mandolin
Stu Kimball – Rhythm guitar
George Receli – Drums, Percussion
Charlie Sexton – Lead guitar

References

External links
BobLinks – Comprehensive log of concerts and set lists
BobDylan.com – Bob Dylan's Official Website Tour Page
Bjorner's Still on the Road – Information on recording sessions and performances

Bob Dylan concert tours
2016 concert tours